Yugandhar  is a 1979 Indian Telugu-language action film directed by K. S. R. Das. The film stars N. T. Rama Rao and Jayasudha, with music composed by Ilaiyaraaja. It is a remake of the Hindi film Don (1978).

Plot

Yugandhar is a deadly and daredevil gangster. A special Interpol officer David is assigned to work with SP Jagannath. In spite of being on Interpol's most wanted list, Yugandhar remains elusive to the police. He kills one of his gang members Ramesh (Prasad Babu) when he finds out that he is an informer of the police. His fiancée Kamini tries to avenge his death, but Yugandhar kills her also. Thereafter, Ramesh's sister Jaya takes judo and karate lessons in order to take revenge and she enters Yugandhar's gang. Once Police get an opportunity to nab Yugandhar, the police finally succeed. Unfortunately, Yugandhar dies, which Jagannath only knows and he secretly buries Yugandhar's body, ensuring that people believe he may still be alive; Jagannath while returning after the funeral of Yugandhar, to his fortune he encounters with Vijay, who resembles Yugandhar. Jagannath hatches a plan to replace Yugandhar with Vijay so he can arrest the rest of the gang. Vijay is a street dancer who adopts two orphan kids and looks after them affectionately. Jagannath requests Vijay to go in place of Yugandhar after assuring him that he will take care of the kids. Vijay agrees. In fact, the kids' father Ram Singh is in jail. Ram Singh used to work in a circus company. He has an extraordinary talent for opening any type of locker. Once Shankar, one of the gang members, offers Ram Singh to open a bank safe. In the beginning, Ram Singh refuses, but he is compelled to do so when his wife is in serious condition. Unfortunately, he was caught by Jagannath, in that attack Ram Singh loses a limb and his wife dies in hospital.

Meanwhile, Jagannath sends Vijay into the gang as a person who has lost his memory. Ram Singh, just released from jail, begins his mission against Jagannath and his search for his children. Eventually, like Vijay, learns more and more about Yugandhar and announces to his colleagues that he got back his memory. Vijay manages to replace the red diary which contains entire details of the gang and plans to give it to Jagannath. Jaya goes after him, but Vijay survives the attack and explains that he is Vijay. Jaya apologizes to Vijay and they fall in love. Vijay informs Jaganadham about a celebration where all big smugglers and gangsters of the country are attending. When Jagannath is about to start, Ram Singh obstructs his way, but could not do so as he learns that his children are with Jagannath. Jaganadham tells him that he will inform regarding them in his return. But things take a drastic turn when the police raid the celebrations, Vijay's only witness to his true identity, Jagannath, is shot dead, and Vijay is arrested because the police think that he is Yugandhar. The diary that Vijay had handed over to Jagannath, which is his last hope, is stolen by Ram Singh. However, he escapes from the police and he begins to fight for himself and tries to prove his innocence. Jaya agrees to help him. Meanwhile, the gang kidnaps Ram Singh's children to take Vijay into their hold. Ram Singh blackmails the gang as he is possessing the dairy. In that process, he discovers that Interpol officer David is the original gang leader who also murdered Jagannath. Ram Singh goes to negotiations with David when the police come there and Ram Singh was kept in a room where his children are present, Ram Singh takes children and runs away. At the same time, Vijay arrives, both of them mistake each other as the enemy of the children and a quarrel arose between them. After knowing the truth from the children, both of them join hands, along with Jaya, catch the entire gang and Vijay proves that he is not Yugandhar.

Cast
 N. T. Rama Rao as Yugandhar and Vijay
 Jayasudha as Jaya
 Satyanarayana as Ram Singh
 Jaggayya as SP Jagannath
 Prabhakar Reddy as David 
 Kanta Rao as Inspector Varma
 Thyagaraju as Shankar 
 Prasad Babu as Ramesh
 Jayamalini as Kamini
 Sheela as Anita

Soundtrack 
Music was composed by Ilaiyaraaja. The song "Vorrabbaa Vesukunnaa Killii" is based on "Khaike Pan Banaraswala" from Don.

Related film
In 2009, a second Telugu remake of the Hindi film Don, titled Billa, was released. Jayasudha played a guest role, different from the role she played in Yugandhar.

References

External links
 

1979 films
Indian action thriller films
Films about organised crime in India
Telugu remakes of Hindi films
Films directed by K. S. R. Das
Films scored by Ilaiyaraaja
1970s Telugu-language films
Films with screenplays by Salim–Javed
1970s action thriller films
Films about lookalikes